Yaakov Shaul Elyashar (1 June 1817 – 21 July 1906), also known as Yisa Berakhah, was a 19th-century Sephardi rabbi in Ottoman Syria. He became Sephardi Chief Rabbi of Palestine in 1893.

Biography and rabbinic career
Yaakov Shaul Elyashar was born in Safed to a prominent Sephardi rabbinical family which had resided in the Land of Israel for centuries. His father, Rabbi Eliezer Yeruham Elyashar, was a shochet. In 1824, when Elyashar was 7, his father died. The family was thrown into poverty, and his mother sold her home and belongings and supported her only son by working as a seamstress. They moved to Jerusalem, and in 1828, she married Rabbi Binyamin Mordechai Navon, who adopted Elyashar and became his teacher and mentor. By the time of his Bar Mitzvah, he was already considered a Torah prodigy. In 1832 at age 15, Elyashar married an orphaned girl. They had four children, three of whom were born while they were still living in his stepfather's home. In 1853 he was appointed dayan in Jerusalem, and sent as the emissary of Jerusalem's Sephardic community to Alexandria to persuade the Jewish community there to annul its decision to cease receiving rabbinic emissaries from the Land of Israel. He was successful in persuading them to annul the decision and was invited to become the city's rabbi, but refused. He became associate head of the Jerusalem beth din in 1855 and head of the beth din in 1869.

In 1893 he became the Rishon LeZion or Sephardi chief rabbi of Palestine following the death of Rishon LeZion Raphael Meir Panigel. He remained in this position for the next 13 years until his death in 1906. Rabbi Shmuel Salant was the chief rabbi of the Ashkenazi community at the time and they enjoyed very warm relations and collaborated on various issues affecting the entire Jewish community in Palestine.

Elyashar wrote thousands of responses to questions from Ashkenazim, Sephardim and Temanim throughout the world, most of which were published in the Questions and Responsa "Maase Ish".

Commemoration and legacy
The Jerusalem neighborhood of Givat Shaul is named after Elyashar.

One of his great-grandchildren was Israeli politician and writer Eliyahu Elyashar.

References

External links
Biography of Rabbi Yaakov Shaul Eliashar

1817 births
1906 deaths
People from Safed
19th-century rabbis from the Ottoman Empire
Rishon LeZion (rabbi)
Burials at the Jewish cemetery on the Mount of Olives
Rabbis in Ottoman Galilee
Authors of books on Jewish law
Sephardi rabbis in Ottoman Palestine